Brian John Bingman (born December 9, 1953) is an American Republican politician from the U.S. state of Oklahoma serving as Secretary of State and Native American Affairs and was formerly the President Pro Tempore of the Oklahoma Senate.

He currently works for Uplands Resources Inc. in Tulsa as vice-president of Land and Operations and is the current president of the Energy Council, an international coalition of states and Canadian province leaders in energy policy.

Bingman is a member of the Creek Nation and the Sapulpa Chamber of Commerce.

Early life
Bingman received a BBA in Petroleum Land Management from the University of Oklahoma in 1976. Bingman continues active participation in the American Association of Petroleum Landmen, Tulsa Association of Petroleum Landmen and the Oklahoma Independent Producers Association.  He is an active member of the First Presbyterian Church of Sapulpa.

Political career
Bingman served as Mayor of Sapulpa, Oklahoma from 1992 to 2004.

Bingman was elected to the Oklahoma House of Representatives in 2004 and the Oklahoma Senate in 2006. He won his 2006 Senate election with 10,668 votes to opponent John Mark Young's 9,593 votes.

Bingman was appointed the co-chairman of the Energy Committee in 2006 and was re-appointed as the sole chairman of the committee upon the Republican majority election in 2008.

Bingman became President Pro Tempore of the Senate on January 4, 2011.

Election results

References

External links
 Senator Bingman's Official Website
 Oklahoma State Election Board, 2004

|-

1953 births
Living people
Politicians from Tulsa, Oklahoma
Presbyterians from Oklahoma
Secretaries of State of Oklahoma
Republican Party Oklahoma state senators
Mayors of places in Oklahoma
Muscogee (Creek) Nation state legislators in Oklahoma
Native American mayors
20th-century American politicians
21st-century American politicians
20th-century Native American politicians
21st-century Native American politicians
Candidates in the 2018 United States elections
University of Oklahoma alumni